Grigory Alekseyevich Yavlinsky (born 10 April 1952) is a Russian economist and politician. He authored the 500 Days Program, a plan for the transition of the Soviet regime to a free-market economy, and is the former leader of the social-liberal Yabloko party. He has run three times for Russia's presidency. In 1996 he ran against Boris Yeltsin, finishing fourth with 7.3% of the vote. In 2000 Yavlinsky ran against Vladimir Putin, finishing third with 5.8%. In the 2012 presidential election he was prevented from running for president by Russian authorities, despite collecting the necessary 2 million signatures of Russian citizens for his candidacy. Yavlinsky was Yabloko's candidate for Russian President in the 2018 presidential election, when he ran against Putin and got 1.05% of the vote, according to official results.

Yavlinsky holds a PhD in economics from the Central Economic Mathematical Institute of the Russian Academy of Sciences; his doctoral dissertation was entitled "The socio-economic system of Russia and the problem of its modernisation". He is a professor at the National Research University Higher School of Economics.

Early life and career
Yavlinsky was born in Lviv, Ukrainian SSR to Jewish parents. His father, Aleksei Yavlinsky, was an officer, and his mother, Vera Naumovna, a chemistry teacher at an institute. Both his parents are buried in Lviv, while his brother Mikhail still lives there. He is related to Natan Yavlinsky, the nuclear physicist who invented tokamak.

In 1967 and 1968, he was the champion of the Ukrainian SSR in junior boxing. He decided to become an economist during his school years. From 1967 to 1976, he studied at the Plekhanov Institute of the National Economy in Moscow as a labour economist and took a post-graduate course there. While a candidate of economics, he worked in the coal sector. After finishing his postgraduate studies he was employed by the All-Soviet Union Coal Mines Department Research Institute. His job was to draft new unified work instructions for the coal industry. He was the first person in the USSR to complete this assignment. To perform his duties, he had to go down the mines. One of his shifts nearly ended tragically for him when the mine collapsed. Together with four workers, he spent ten hours waist-deep in ice-cold water, waiting for help. Three of his fellow sufferers died in hospital after their rescue. Yavlinsky spent four years at this job. He saw it as an opportunity to see the world hidden behind the propaganda posters. He reported about the horrible conditions in which the coal miners lived and worked, but his reports had no impact.

In 1980, Yavlinsky was assigned to the USSR State Committee for Labour and Social Affairs in charge of the heavy industry sector. In this position he began to develop a project aimed at improving the USSR labour system. He identified two different ways to enhance the efficiency of the system: either establish total control over every move of every worker in the country or alternatively give enterprises more independence. His report on the project did not prove popular with the head of the State Committee for Labour, Yury Batalin. The KGB confiscated 600 draft copies of Yavlinsky's report and interrogated him several times. When Brezhnev died in 1982, the KGB finally left Yavlinsky alone. However, he had to stop working as he was diagnosed with tuberculosis and sent to a closed medical facility for nine months. The drafts of his report were burned together with his other personal belongings as contagious. 

From 1984, he held a management position at the Labour Ministry and then at the Council of Ministers of the USSR. In this capacity, he had to join Communist Party of the Soviet Union, of which he was a member in 1985–1991. He was head of the Joint Economic Department of the Government of the USSR. In 1989, he was made department head of the Statement Commission for Economic Reforms run by Academician Leonid Abalkin.

Post-Soviet economic reforms. 1990-1992 
Yavlinsky's commitment to a market economy was established in 1990 when he wrote 500 Days – a programme for the Soviet Union in which he proposed the rapid transition from a centrally planned economy to a free market economy in less than two years. To implement the programme, Yavlinsky was appointed Deputy Chairman of the Council of Ministers of the RSFSR and Deputy Chairman of the State Commission for Economic Reform. President of the USSR Mikhail Gorbachev decided to combine Yavlinsky's programme with another one which had been developed simultaneously. The other programme, "The Main Directives for Development", had been created by the Chairman of the Council of Ministers Nikolai Ryzhkov, who threatened to resign if his project was rejected. In October 1990, when it became clear that his programme would not be implemented, Yavlinsky resigned from the government. He then established his own think tank, EPICenter, which brought together many members of his 500 Days team who were to become his future associates in Yabloko (Sergei Ivanenko, Aleksei Melnikov, Aleksei Mikhailov, etc.).

In the summer of 1991, while working in Harvard, he co-authored a new reform programme jointly with Graham Allison, which offered a platform for Gorbachev's negotiations with the G7 over financial aid in support of a transition to a market economy. After the defeat of the hardline August 1991 coup against Gorbachev and Yeltsin, he was appointed Deputy Chairman of the Committee for Management of the National Economy which operated in place of Soviet government. The new President of the RSFSR Boris Yeltsin asked Yavlinsky to return to the government and even considered making him Prime Minister. In this role Yavlinsky successfully negotiated an economic union among Soviet republics. The agreement was signed by representatives of twelve republics in Alma-Ata on 18 October 1991. However, when Yeltsin signed the Belavezh Accords, which led to the breakup of the Soviet Union and the rupture of all political and economic connections between the former Soviet republics, Yavlinsky left again as a sign of protest against Yeltsin's actions. A year later, Yavlinsky started his own political career.

When the "shock therapy" reforms were launched by Yeltsin and Yegor Gaidar in January 1992, Yavlinsky became an outspoken critic of these policies, emphasising the differences between his programme and Gaidar's reform programme (such as the sequencing of privatisation versus the liberalisation of prices and the applicability of his program to the entire Soviet Union):"Certainly, they have no program. They have some elements of policy . . . and they are very contradictory".In 1992, Yavlinsky served as advisor to Boris Nemtsov who was at the time the Governor of Nizhny Novgorod Region. Yavlinsky developed a regional economic reform programme for Nemtsov. Later, however, their paths diverged, as Nemtsov sided with Yeltsin's government on most issues, eventually becoming deputy prime minister and one of the founders and leaders of the Union of Right Forces, while Yavlinsky became the leader of the liberal opposition to Yeltsin.

Political activities during Yeltsin's presidency. 1993-2000 
In 1993, as the conflict intensified between Yeltsin and the parliament over the shock therapy programme, Yavlinsky had high ratings in the polls as a potential presidential candidate and the image of an independent, centrist politician, untainted by corruption. In September–October 1993, he joined a group of senior politicians who tried to mediate between Yeltsin and the parliament. However, after the outbreak of hostilities on the streets of Moscow on 3 October, he unequivocally called on Yeltsin to use force against militants on the streets and other armed supporters of the parliament.

When Yeltsin set the date for the elections to the new parliament and a constitutional referendum for 12 December 1993, Yavlinsky had to cobble together an electoral bloc in haste, as he had no party of his own, and had to recruit existing parties as co-founders. His bloc was co-founded by three of them, the Republican Party of the Russian Federation, Social Democratic Party of Russia and Christian Democratic Party of Russia, all three tilting on most issues toward the Yeltsin camp.

The top three names on the slate – Yavlinsky, Yury Boldyrev (former State Controller and disaffected democrat) and Vladimir Lukin (at the time Russia's ambassador to the US) – gave the bloc its initial name, "Yavlinsky-Boldyrev-Lukin", abbreviated as YABLOKO. With no prior electoral experience, Yabloko succeeded in winning 7.9% of the vote in December 1993 and forming the fifth largest faction in the Duma. After Boldyrev clashed with Yavlinsky over a draft law on production-sharing agreements and left the bloc in 1995, the name was retained, but now reinterpreted as the "Yavlinsky Bloc". In 1995, the Yabloko caucus in the Duma set up its own political association which was reincorporated as a political party in 2001.

One of the features distinguishing the party from other liberal parties was its critique of Yeltsin's policies, from the economic "shock therapy" and the handling of the 1993 Russian constitutional crisis to the First Chechen War and Russia's relations with the West. Yavlinsky established himself as a leader of the democratic opposition. In this capacity, he was a principled opponent of Gaidar's Russia's Choice and its successors in parliament, such as the Union of Right Forces. In turn, they accused him of being too inflexible and blamed his personality for the failure to merge with other democrats in order to mount a concentrated electoral challenge to the hardline forces. Others, however, admitted that there were philosophical differences between Yavlinsky's unspoken social democratic bent and the neoliberal orientation of his democratic opponents.

In September 1998, after Russia's 1998 financial crash brought down Sergei Kirienko's government, Yavlinsky proposed the candidacy of Yevgeny Primakov who was elected Prime Minister in spite of resistance from Yeltsin, his family and entourage. This helped resolve the political stalemate and many credit Primakov with rescuing the economy from chaos and with the start of the recovery of the industrial production that continued under Vladimir Putin. However, Yavlinsky declined Primakov's offer to join his Communist-dominated government as deputy prime minister for social policies and soon joined the ranks of his critics on the liberal side. Later in 1999 Yavlinsky criticised Primakov as a throwback to the stagnation days of Soviet leader Leonid Brezhnev. Interfax quoted him saying on one occasion: "This Brezhnev style of government absolutely does not suit us". Yavlinsky said Primakov relied too much on communists and other leftists who do not understand modern economics. However, Yavlinsky warned Yeltsin against sacking the entire government, as he believed that this would have set up a showdown with the State Duma of the kind that had led Primakov to be appointed Prime Minister in the first place.

In May 1999, Yavlinsky joined forces with the Communist Party in an attempt to impeach Yeltsin. The news media had been full of speculation that if the Duma were to proceed with the impeachment, Yeltsin might retaliate by firing the communist-backed Cabinet of Prime Minister Yevgeny Primakov. This would have precipitated a political crisis and the possible dissolution of the Duma and threatened the political stability that Primakov has brought Russia since previous summer. Of the four charges of impeachment, the one accusing Yeltsin of abuse of power in connection with war in Chechnya garnered the most support from both parties. Yavlinsky said that this was a warning to all politicians that they would be judged for their actions. Just as the Communists began to nod their assent, Yavlinsky attacked them, dismissing the other charges as politically inspired. He said that Yeltsin had made serious mistakes, sometimes fateful, during the reforms, which had led to the bankruptcy of the country, not out of a desire to destroy Russia, but because he was  unable to make a break with his past, and that he had not intended to destroy or liquidate anyone, and did not have such a conscious goal. In summary, Yavlinsky declared:Such indifference and negligence is a long-time tradition of the Communist-Bolshevik leaders from whose midst he (Yeltsin) rose and with whom his entire biography is linked. The Communist regime headed by Stalin deliberately murdered tens of millions of citizens of various nationalities. The party which proclaims as its historical leaders and heroes Lenin and Stalin, the ideologists and organizers of massive crimes against humanity, assumes responsibility for these atrocities with cynical pride.Although Yavlinsky's repeated statements that all the party's 46 State Duma deputies would vote unanimously in favour of the charge on the Chechen war, eight defected and sided with Yeltsin. The outcome was still 17 votes short of the two-thirds majority (300 votes) needed to start impeachment proceedings.

In 1996 and 2000, Yavlinsky ran for President with the backing of his party and other organizations. In 1996 presidential elections he came fourth and received 7.3% of the vote. In the 2000 presidential elections he finished third and received 5.8% of the vote. In both cases, he did not subsequently offer his support to either Yeltsin or Putin or their Communist opponent in both elections, Gennady Zyuganov.

Yavlinsky never concealed his lukewarm view of the breakup of the Soviet Union in 1991 which occurred while he was negotiating an economic treaty among the republics. However, he never advocated a restoration of the Soviet Union or a revision of post-Soviet borders.

Yavlinsky was at times critical of US policies toward Russia, particularly under the Clinton administration. Some of his most trenchant criticisms are contained in his lecture at the Nobel Institute delivered in May 2000.

Political activities during Putin's first and second presidential terms. 2000-2008 

Under the Putin presidency, Yavlinsky remained an active opponent of any military solution to the problems in Chechnya. In 2002, he took part in the negotiations with the Chechen terrorists during the Moscow theatre hostage crisis and was praised by President Vladimir Putin for his role in the standoff. His party also campaigned against imports of radioactive waste into Russia, thereby building a crucial alliance with environmental NGOs, as well as with human rights organisations, labour unions, women associations, and ethnic minority groups. He was also an uncompromising critic of the government reforms under Putin of the housing and utilities sector and the energy sector. On a number of occasions the Yabloko faction in the State Duma initiated petitioning campaigns for the resignation of the government. 

Yavlinsky has had difficult relations with the authorities both under Yeltsin and under Putin. While supporting Putin's early foreign policies of developing closer ties to the United States, he remained critical of domestic policies, in particular the arrest of Mikhail Khodorkovsky in the fall of 2003. He became even more outspoken about the assault on democratic freedoms in Russia and insisted that Putin's policies represented a direct continuation of Yeltsin's policies. 

In the 2003 elections to the Duma, Yabloko failed to cross the 5% threshold of Duma representation. Yavlinsky later recalled that Putin had telephoned him early on election night to congratulate him, apparently believing – or pretending to believe – that Yabloko had succeeded in gaining representation.

Yavlinsky refused to run for president in 2004, claiming that Putin had rigged the elections to the point of making them meaningless.  

After the Yabloko Party failed again to secure representation in the 2007 Russian legislative election, there was some possibility that Yavlinsky might run again for presidency in 2008. However, Yabloko and Yavlinsky himself supported the longshot and largely symbolic candidacy of émigré dissident Vladimir Bukovsky who in the end failed to clear legal obstacles to his registration.

On 22 June 2008, Yavlinsky stepped down as party leader at Yabloko's 15th congress, proposing in his place the candidacy of Moscow City Duma deputy Sergey Mitrokhin who was elected as the new party chairman. Yavlinsky remained a member of Yabloko's Political Committee (elected there with the largest number of votes) and a regular spokesman for the party, particularly in local election campaigns.

Global financial crisis. 2007-2009 
In an interview at HSE's conference Yavlinsky stated that common disease for all states in the late 20th century — early 21st century was the merger of the state with business. According to Yavlinsky, this is a key trigger of the economic crisis in the US. A fusion of Wall Street and the White House paralyzed all the possibilities of Barack Obama other than the injection of fresh money in the old economy. Such an approach has no future owing to the level of public debt and poor quality of the state in decision making, he told.

According to Yavlinsky, the global financial crisis of 2007-2009 happened owing to the appearance of insurance-backed loans, which led to a dramatic increase in the number and volume of such loans. If a business goes insolvent, creditors are paid by the insurance. This created the impression that the loans were safe. However, the reliability of borrowers declined. When too many extremely unreliable loans were issued in the United States, at some point a number of borrowers went insolvent at the same time, making it impossible to pay the insurance, Yavlinsky wrote. As a result, no money was returned to the lenders. As a result, the biggest banks and investment companies went bankrupt. In simple terms, this is a gigantic "financial pyramid" (Ponzi scheme), he says.Let's assume you borrow from someone, but things don't work out. However, you still need to pay them back and pay the interest. So you borrow from someone else paying them interest. To pay back, you borrow more, and so on and so on until it ends in failure. The enormous scale of the "financial pyramid" became possible because of extremely lax financial regulation of the government.In his opinion, the crisis could have been resolved by bankrupting all the financiers and bankers responsible. However, as there were too many of them, and in many respects the economy was dependent on them, such an approach might engender even greater social problems. In addition, they are so integrated in the US power elites. Therefore, owing to fears of social unrest, the US government saved them by giving them funds financed by the taxpayers, in the end helping the parties that were actually responsible for the crisis. Applying this approach, the officials hoped that the economy would work and would start to grow after receiving a huge infusion. However, economic activity didn't grow despite the USD 750 billion injected by the Bush administration and the USD 800 billion invested by the Obama administration because of market distrust.

In the book Realeconomik: The Hidden Cause of the Great Recession (and How to Avert the Next One), Yavlinsky makes the case that a stable global economy cannot be achieved without a commitment to established social principles in business and politics:The title and subtitle reflect the central idea of the book: the cause of the crisis is that at the core, modern capitalism is concerned with money and power, not ideals, morals, or principles. The word Realeconomik is used as an analogue to Realpolitik, a pejorative term for politics that masquerades as practicality while in fact comprising the cynicism, coercion, and amorality of Machiavellian principles. An entire generation of Western politicians, businessmen, and economists has come of age without ever thinking seriously about the relationship between morality and economics or ethics and politics. I do not seek to make any moral judgments: I aim instead to be descriptive and analytical. My goal is to indicate those areas that are usually not discussed in public. I feel the urgency to state clearly the things that I believe to be crucial to understanding the events unfolding before our eyes. The nature of the Great Recession is not only economic, or perhaps not even attributable mainly to economic factors. Neither is it the product of mere complacency and negligence of duty on the part of authorities and top-level managers in the private sector, as some experts insist. Rather, the underlying fundamentals and causes go deeper - to such things as general rules of society and the logic to which they are subject, encompassing the issues of individual and social values, moral guidance, and public control, as well as their evolution over the past several decades. These issues are much more serious and have a greater impact on economic performance than is customarily believed.Yavlinsky argues that the world of money should not be viewed as separate from culture and society: he believes that the financial crisis was merely a symptom of a wider moral collapse, and that it is time to examine how we live:Even comparatively sophisticated ways of responding to this crisis, as proposed by many, such as writing new, stringent rules, exercising more public control over their enforcement, imposing taxes on some kinds of financial operations, and the like will not resolve fundamental problems, which are not simply economic. Far less will be achieved by simply "pouring money on the crisis," even if it is accompanied by exposing the banking secrets of thousands of officials and businessmen. There are no ready-made solutions to these problems. However, I hope Realeconomik will provide a fresh perspective for anyone concerned about another bursting bubble, persistently high unemployment, the "new normal" (economic stagnation in a low-growth, low-inflation environment), financial volatility, sharply rising poverty rates (even in industrialised nations such as the United States), and social unrest, or the possibility of something more catastrophic. It is difficult to talk about the economy from the perspective of morality, as the very concept of morality seems to be devoid of established content, is subject to broad interpretation, and is often rather elusive. But those difficulties seem insufficient reason to exclude morality from economic analysis and research. It is essential to treat the issue of morality seriously and extensively to provide a meaningful perspective for economic processes and their consequences, especially in the framework of long term analysis.

Federal and regional elections and following protests. 2011-2012 
In September 2011 Yavlinsky was appointed head of the electoral list of Yabloko Party for the State Duma elections of the sixth convocation by a resolution of the party's congress. According to the official results of the elections held on 4 December 2011, Yabloko failed to surmount the five per cent barrier and as a result was not accorded any seats in the Russian parliament. However, the party gained more votes than in previous elections (3.43%), thereby securing state financing. At the same time, Yabloko candidates were elected in three regions, including the Legislative Assembly of Saint Petersburg where the party won 12.5% of the votes and six mandates. Yavlinsky, who also headed the party list for these elections, agreed to head the Yabloko fraction in Saint Petersburg and received the mandate of a state deputy on 14 December 2011. 

On 18 December 2011 Yavlinsky was nominated by the Yabloko Party congress as the party's candidate for the Russian presidential elections scheduled for 4 March 2012. On 18 January 2011 he submitted to the Central Electoral Commission of the Russian Federation the 2 million signatures in support of his candidacy required to participate in the elections. After checking the signatures, the commission claimed to have identified photocopies of signatures and refused to register Yavlinsky as a candidate, rejecting 25.66% of the submitted signatures on the grounds that they were defective.

On 8 February 2012 the Supreme Court of the Russian Federation rejected Yavlinsky's appeal against the decision of the Central Electoral Commission, finding the decision not to register his candidacy to be legal. Commenting on his disqualification, Yavlinsky declared that the decision was politically motivated.

Yavlinsky actively supported the protests in Russia in December 2011 – March 2012 against the falsifications during the elections and was a frequent speaker at the meetings "For Fair Elections" in Moscow. On 14 and 15 May he visited Saint Isaac's Square in Saint Petersburg where the opposition camp was located. He participated in the "March of Millions" in Moscow on 6 May and 12 June.

Work in the Legislative Assembly of Saint Petersburg. 2011-2016 
At the elections of deputies of the Legislative Assembly of Saint Petersburg of the 5th convocation Yavlinsky was the only candidate in the municipal part of Yabloko's list and on this basis headed the party at the Saint Petersburg elections. According to official data, the party won 12.5% of the votes and formed a faction of six deputies in the city parliament. Throughout his term as a deputy  (December 2011 to September 2016), Yavlinsky worked in Saint Petersburg several days a week, while continuing to live in Moscow. He participated in plenary sessions, committee sessions, would see constituents and address their concerns.

During his work at the legislative assembly Yavlinsky prepared the conceptual strategy "Greater Saint Petersburg. 21st Century", which combined economic, spatial and time-based approaches to the development of the entire metropolitan area of Saint Petersburg and Leningrad Region – Greater Saint Petersburg. It was submitted in February 2015 to the Governor of the city Georgy Poltavchenko. In April 2015 Yavlinsky outlined the key concepts of the document to representatives of the authorities and business of Saint Petersburg and Leningrad Region at the first strategic session held as part of preparations for the forum "Harmony of Versatility".

During the five years of work of the Yabloko fraction headed by Yavlinsky, Saint Petersburg's parliament adopted 25 per cent of the numerous initiatives proposed by Yabloko's deputies (almost 100 in total).

Events in Ukraine in 2014 and the war in the Donbass 
At the end of February 2014 Yavlinsky published in the Russian business daily Vedomosti an article with the heading "Russia is creating a zone of instability around its borders". He wrote that a social contract had existed in Ukraine until the end of autumn 2013: the people had been prepared to endure Yanukovych as long as they could see the country moving towards Europe. Yavlinsky notes in the article that on the eve of the signing of the EU Association Agreement, it became clear that the European option was not splitting the country: on the contrary, it was bringing people together. Notwithstanding all the serious Ukrainian internal drivers of the evolving crisis, it was primarily attributable to developments in Russia:Russia's unnatural refusal to move along the European path implies a rift in the post-Soviet space. The Ukrainian crisis is the result of this rift. Instead of moving together with Ukraine towards Europe, Russia is trying to draw the country in the diametrically opposing direction. Through its renunciation of the European vector, Russia is creating a zone of instability, as virtually all its Western and even southern neighbours are in the final analysis striving for Europe. Accordingly, all these countries will have significant forces fighting Russia's plans to hold them back and not let them go. Sooner or later the instability caused by this erroneous anti-European course will also come to Russia itself.On 16 March 2014, on the eve of the referendum in Crimea, Yavlinsky published an article in the independent Russian newspaper Novaya Gazeta entitled: "Peace, not war. How to achieve the former and prevent the latter". In the article, he wrote in particular:The positions and actions of the powers-that-be in Russia in respect of Ukraine and in connection with developments there are a reckless political adventure.

We believe that it is absolutely unacceptable to even raise the idea of using Russian troops in Ukraine. This is the position held by Yabloko.

We also believe that the separation of Crimea from Ukraine and its annexation is an error at the national level.

The fundamental goal of such a policy implemented by the leadership of our country is clear. This is the positioning of Ukraine as a "failed state", which is popular among the entourage close to the powers that be. They tend to believe that it is in Russia's interests to push Ukraine into political degradation and territorial collapse, or to transform it into a puppet state.

We are convinced that it is in Russia's interests to make an immediate break with such ideology and to bring such policies to an end.

The immediate result of Crimea's annexation would be to transform Russia into a country with zero reputation and borders that are not recognised internationally.In the same article Yavlinsky advocated the immediate convening of an International Conference on political, legal and military issues related to Ukraine, in particular, on a range of Crimean issues. In October 2014, the Federal Political Committee of the Yabloko Party on the initiative of Grigory Yavlinsky adopted a decision to assess developments in the Donbass, stating in particular:The annexation of Crimea and transfer of Russian weapons to so-called "separatists", the sending of volunteers to them, propaganda and military support from Russia — all these factors can be defined as "warmongering".On 13 December 2014 at a Yabloko Party meeting, Grigory Yavlinsky advocated the creation of a "buffer zone" between Russia and Ukraine, with the participation of international observers, negotiations with Ukraine's leadership, the removal of mercenaries and materiel from the country and the provision of guarantees to the public which should in the end lead to the holding of a "legitimate referendum" on the status of Crimea organised under Ukrainian law "so that this problem does not haunt Russia forever". "We need to say: Yes, Crimea is not our territory".  At the same time, Yavlinsky stated that Crimea's future should be determined by the inhabitants of the peninsula on the basis of respective legislation: "We hold that the referendum on 16 March 2014 was illegal, conducted in a rush with utter disregard for any rules, laws and norms and under the "protection" of the Russian Armed Forces." "I want my country to have internationally recognised borders. I want people living in Crimea to be fully-fledged citizens of Europe. However, the key is that this issue should be resolved in such a way that Russia can say: We are a European country, we are building our future together with Europe on the same rules governing how hundreds of millions of people live". The politician proposed that a "legal and legitimate referendum (or local referenda with prospects of the cantonisation of Crimea)" be held based on Ukrainian legislation and international norms of law "agreed with Kyiv, the Crimean authorities, Russia, the EU, OBSE and the United Nations." Such a referendum conducted under stringent international control should contain three questions: whether the people want to live as part of Ukraine, as an independent Crimean state or as part of Russia.

Yavlinsky and Yabloko prioritised the topics of the war in Donbass and the annexation of Crimea during the party's election campaign for the State Duma of the 7th convocation in 2016. During the election campaign, on federal TV channels, Yavlinsky repeatedly criticised the Kremlin's policy in Ukraine and disclosed that Russian citizens were participating in the military actions in Ukraine.

In 2017 Yavlinsky developed a peace plan for Donbass consisting of 10 points. The plan provided guarantees for the long-term safety of the region's inhabitants and proposed an end to the war. It was one of the key policy documents of Yavlinsky's presidential campaign in 2018.

State Duma elections in 2016 
A Yabloko Party congress held in July 2016 established the electoral list of the party's candidates for the elections to the State Duma of the 7th convocation. Based on the party's voting results, Yavlinsky was elected head of the federal list of the Yabloko Party.

Yavlinsky stated that the State Duma campaign should be perceived exclusively as part of preparations for the Russian presidential elections in 2018. On 23 April 2016 at a meeting of the Political Committee of the Yabloko Party, Yavlinsky declared that the expansion of the powers of the employees of the law enforcement authorities in the law "On the Police" and the creation of Rosgvardiya (National Guard of the Russian Federation) were actions adopted by the regime to prepare for the 2018 presidential elections, which will become the "bifurcation point":  The presidential elections – these represent possibly the last chance for peaceful regime change with no spilling of blood.At the Yabloko Party congress in July 2016 Yavlinsky declared that society must establish a comprehensive alternative to Vladimir Putin at the impending presidential elections, and start fighting for this choice:Without this step, it will not prove possible to change the regime in Russia peacefully and legally, and there is simply no other method.Yabloko's election programme entitled "Respect for the Individual" stated:This is a programme for the transition from a state of war to a state of peace, from the power of corruption to the power of law, from state lies to truth, from injustice to justice, from violence to dignity, from humiliation of the individual to respect for the individual.Yabloko's experts drafted a package of more than 140 draft laws in 20 different sectors that they planned to submit to the State Duma if elected. The draft laws included the "Land-Home-Roads" programme developed by Yavlinsky and a set of laws to overcome the consequences of the criminal privatisation of the mid-1990s. In addition, Yavlinsky proposed his own Economic Manifesto to the regime: the economic programme prioritised the adoption of a clear and unambiguous decision in favour of economic development and growth as the goal of both economic and state policy.  

Representing the party in election debates on federal TV channels and radio stations, Yavlinsky reiterated the need to settle the military conflict in Donbass and resolve the Crimean issue. He dubbed the war between Russia and Ukraine a crime and condemned the senseless military operation in Syria. He noted that the Russian economy was being destroyed by politics, and that if this did not stop, Russia might soon end up as an underdeveloped country for good, inevitably leading to the country's collapse, given its size and borders with the most unstable regions.

According to the official results, Yabloko Party won 1.99% of the total votes (1,051,535 votes) in the State Duma elections. Immediately after they were announced, the party's leadership issued a statement rejecting the results and accusing the authorities of tampering with actual electoral turnout and falsifying the voting. The party declared:The State Duma has for the first time in the new Russian history been formed by a minority of the country's population. Consequently, it does not represent Russian society and is not a body of popular representation. Tampering with the actual turnout, instances of mass compulsory voting, as well as direct falsification during the counting of the votes and drafting of the protocols, does not make it possible to declare the federal elections held on 18 September to be honest and legitimate.Summarising the election results, Yavlinsky said that the importance of Yabloko's participation in these elections was to tell the truth: on the criminal nature of the war with Ukraine, the senselessness of the war in Syria, the need to rectify the Crimean problem, the depleted nature of the economic system and the dead end facing the country. Against this backdrop, the party had participated in the elections to create the requisite conditions for the peaceful transformation of the system. In the opinion of Yabloko's leader, this can only be achieved through the transparent and coherent demonstration that millions of people in Russia support such a position.

Presidential elections in 2018 
In June 2015 the Yabloko Party declared that it was necessary to establish an alternative to Vladimir Putin as the only effective strategy of the democratic opposition and proposed Yavlinsky for this role three years before the presidential election.

The following is taken from the decision of the Federal Political Committee of Yabloko "On the Political Strategy of the Party to 2018":The key is that this should not be "someone like Putin, but without corruption", not Putin 2.0, but instead a politician with different convictions, personal qualities, thinking and a modus operandi in politics that is diametrically opposed to Putin's approach since 2000 and to the system which begat him – since the time of the foundation of our Party at the start of the 1990s. Yavlinsky also personifies today a categorical rejection of aggression, annexation and war as a means to build a "Russian world" and the Russian authoritative-oligarchic political and economic system, which inevitably led to the current exclusively hazardous and dead-end political situation.In summer 2017, as part of preparations for the presidential elections, Yabloko conducted a wide-ranging campaign for the withdrawal of Russian armed forces from Syria and the allocation of the freed-up resources in 2017 to deal with the country's internal needs. The renunciation of geopolitical adventures in favour of internal development became the key talking point of Yavlinsky's presidential programme. In a short period over 100,000 signatures were collected throughout Russia. The campaign entitled "Time to return home" also had a significant impact on the public mood. According to the opinion polls, during the campaign the number of advocates for the withdrawal of Russian forces from Syria increased to 50%.

The issue of terminating military actions in the East of Ukraine and determining Crimea's status dominated Yavlinsky's election campaign. In 2017 Yavlinsky developed a peace plan for the Donbass, consisting of 10 points. The plan included a guarantee of long-term safety for the inhabitants of the regime and an end to the war. This plan was one of the key policy documents of Yavlinsky's 2018 presidential campaign. Yavlinsky dedicated a special online project entitled "However, is Crimea our territory?" to the topic of determining Crimea's status, where he advocated, inter alia, convening an international conference and explained how to prevent a war between Russian and Ukraine.

Other key positions of Yavlinsky's presidential campaign included the restoration of direct mayoral elections and the implementation of a new budget policy. He insisted on a change in the tax allocation structure to favour regions and municipalities, as well as a change in budget expenditure priorities – from the financing of the security, defence and law enforcement authorities and the state bureaucracy to social expenditure.

Yavlinsky cited the rise in poverty as a key indicator of the detrimental nature of Russia's politics. He held that reducing poverty and eliminating the excessive stratification of society was the priority objective that the new President of Russia would have to resolve. To achieve this goal, he proposed such measures as exempting the poorest population strata from tax, a one-time windfall tax on major earnings obtained based on the results of the fraudulent cash-for-share auctions conducted in the 1990s, the creation of personal accounts of Russian citizens that would be used for the transfer of revenues from the sale of natural resources, the implementation of the "Land-Homes-Roads" programme. Yavlinsky's programme also prioritised reforms of the judiciary, the inviolability of private property, the independence of the mass media and online freedom.

When participating in the presidential elections, Yavlinsky was aware that he would not defeat the current Head of State Vladimir Putin. He ran on the assumption that a high level of support for the candidate from the democratic opposition would lead to material adjustments to current policies.A change in policy is vital. There is significant demand in our society for a ruthless dictator.  If I am unable to show that different policies enjoy significant backing, then the former demand will be met. When a responsible leader is backed by 10 million people, when they speak the truth frankly and directly, the situation in the country and our life as well starts to change. Such a significant number of people cannot be ignored. The ideas and proposals of their candidate will have to be considered" (from an interview with the radio station Echo Moskvy on 12 January 2018)Shortly before the start of the election campaign, Yavlinsky published an article in mid-December 2017 in Novaya Gazeta entitled "My Truth", where he wrote that the forthcoming "elections" were not elections, but rather the equivalent of an "electoral Halloween' and that in these circumstances, the reason for his participation was:…to fight for truth against the backdrop of lies, Bolshevism and obscurantism, a fight against a real and dangerous political mafia which is leading my country to the precipice. The fight for truth is not comfortable and you have to pay. Formal humiliation over percentages, abuse, undue pressure, gossip from the political in-crowd  - this is the price I am ready to pay.On 22 December 2017 Yavlinsky was officially nominated as the Yabloko Party's candidate in the presidential elections. On 7 February 2018 he was officially registered by the Central Electoral Commission.

During the three-month campaign Yavlinsky travelled almost 40,000 kilometres, visited 20 cities and 16 Russian regions.

According to the official results announced on 18 March 2018, Yavlinsky won 1.05% of the votes and came fifth. However, the Yabloko Party stressed that the "voting results do not reflect the actual results of the elections", as the presidential elections had been transformed into a "plebiscite on support for the current president".  

At the end of March 2018 Yavlinsky published an article in the Russian daily Nezavisimaya Gazeta entitled "The elections were won by a significant minority", in which he analysed the overall election campaign and its results and forecast developments in the country: The politics of Vladimir Putin are destroying the economy and there are no premises for expecting any change. The Kremlin may appoint an inveterate liberal as a minister, "toning down" slightly the anti-West rhetoric and saying something about freedom. However, the key cause of domestic problems and external sanctions is not rhetoric, but instead the political and economic system and political policy which remains unchanged. That is why everyone lost the elections: both the participants, the people who called for a boycott, the people who simply didn't turn up to vote, the majority of people who voted for Putin, honest left wingers and national patriots. And they did not simply lose the elections – they lost any hope of a future. An absolute minority won, who piggyback on politics leading the country to a dangerous dead-end. This is the crux of these developments.

Personal life
Yavlinsky met his wife, Yelena, while studying at the Plekhanov Institute, and the couple have two children. Their son Mikhail was born in 1971 and currently works for the BBC Russian Service in London. Their other son, Aleksey, was born in 1981 and works as a computer programmer in Moscow.

A 2011 interview revealed that during the turbulent times of Russia's politics in the 1990s Yavlinsky's opponents had his 23-year-old piano-playing son kidnapped, and his fingers cut off and mailed to him. He declined to reveal who he thinks is behind the attack saying he "was receiving corresponding letters" prior to the incident.

Books 

Transition to a Market Economy (500 Days Program) St. Martin's Press, New York, 1991)
G. Yavlinsky. Economics and Politics in Russia: Diagnosis . Harvard, 1992.
Laissez-Faire versus Policy-Led Transformation (lesson of the Economic Reforms in Russia) EPIcenter-NikaPrint, 1994
The Inefficiency of Laissez-Faire in Russia: Hysteresis Effects and the Need for Policy-Led Transformation Journal of Comparative Economics. Volume 19, N 1. 1994. G. Yavlinsky and S. Braguinsky.
G. Yavlinsky. An Uncertain Prognosis // Journal of Democracy, Vol. 8, No. 1, January 1997, pp. 3–11.
Russia's Phony Capitalism // Foreign Affairs, 1998. Vol. 77, No. 3.
Braguinsky S., Yavlinsky G. Incentives and Institutions: The Transition to a Market Economy in Russia. Princeton University Press, 2000, 280 pp.
G. A. Yavlinsky. Ten years after the Soviet breakup – Going backwards // Journal of Democracy, 2001. Vol. 12, No. 4, p. 79-86.
G. A. Yavlinsky. Peripheral Capitalism Review By Lilia Shevtsova; 159 pages, Moscow: Integral-Inform, 2003
G. A. Yavlinsky. Realeconomik. The Hidden Cause of the Great Recession (And How to Avert the Next One) / Пер. с рус.: A. W. Bouis. L., New Haven: Yale University Press, 2011.
G. A. Yavlinsky, A.Kosmynin. Peripheral Authoritarianism What Russia Has Achieved and Why.
G. A. Yavlinsky, A.Kosmynin. Notes on History and Politics: the People, the Country, and the Reforms.

See also
1995 Russian legislative election
1999 Russian legislative election
2003 Russian legislative election

References

External links

Official Yavlinsky website  

 
1952 births
Living people
Moscow theater hostage crisis
Yavlinsky
Yavlinsky
Politicians from Lviv
Plekhanov Russian University of Economics alumni
Russian anti-communists
Russian economists
Russian Jews
Jews from Galicia (Eastern Europe)
Academic staff of the Higher School of Economics
2011–2013 Russian protests
21st-century Russian politicians
Yavlinsky
Yabloko politicians
First convocation members of the State Duma (Russian Federation)
Second convocation members of the State Duma (Russian Federation)
Third convocation members of the State Duma (Russian Federation)
Russian activists against the 2022 Russian invasion of Ukraine
Members of Legislative Assembly of Saint Petersburg
Soviet reformers